Frank J. Nies was an American architect best known for having designed numerous Delaware, Lackawanna and Western Railroad stations, at least fifteen of which have been listed on the U.S. National Register of Historic Places (with attribution below as given in NRHP): He sometimes worked with the railroad's chief engineer, Lincoln Bush. Before working for the Delaware, Lackawanna & Western, Nies was a partner in the architectural firm Finkler & Nies, with Adolph Finkler, in Chicago in 1896.

Works
Newark Broad Street Station (1901–03), Broad and University Sts., Newark, N.J., (Nies, Frank J.), NRHP
Delaware, Lackawanna and Western Railroad Station (Dover) (1902), N. Dickerson St., Dover, N.J., (Nies, F.J.), NRHP
Delaware, Lackawanna and Western Railroad Water Gap Station (1903), Waring Dr., Delaware Water Gap, PA, (Nies, Frank,J.), NRHP
Delaware, Lackawanna and Western record building (1904), Hoboken, N.J.
Delaware, Lackawanna and Western Railroad Yard-Dickson Manufacturing Co. Site
Locomotive and Car Repair Shops, Kingslan, N.J. (1904)
Delaware, Lackawanna and Western car shops (1904), Keyser Valley, Pennsylvania 
Delaware, Lackawanna and Western Railroad Station (Boonton) (1905), Myrtle Ave., Main, and Division Sts., Boonton, N.J., (Nies, Frank J.), NRHP
Ampere Station (1907), Ampere Plaza and Whitney Pl., East Orange, N.J., (Nies, Frank J.), NRHP
Delaware, Lackawanna and Western locomotive shops (1907), Scranton, Pennsylvania ,
Lake Hopatcong Station (1911), Landing Road, Roxbury Township, New Jersey; William Hull Botsford, Frank J. Nies, and V. D. Steinbach, architects; NRHP
Bloomfield Station (1912), Washington St. and Glenwood Ave., Bloomfield, N.J., (Nies, Frank J.), NRHP
Delaware, Lackawanna and Western Railroad Station (Morristown) (1913), 132 Morris St., Morristown, N.J., (Nies, F.J.), NRHP
Phillipsburg Union Station (1914), 178 South Main Street, Phillipsburg, New Jersey, NRHP
Station and Freight House, Far Hills, N.J. (1914)
Morris Plains Station (1915), Speedwell Ave., Morris Plains, N.J., (Nies, Frank J.), NRHP
Mountain Station (1915), 449 Vose Ave., South Orange, N.J., (Nies, Frank J.), NRHP
Madison Station (1916), Kings Rd., Madison, N.J., (Nies, Frank J.), NRHP
South Orange Station (1916), 19 Sloan St., South Orange, N.J., (Nies, Frank J.), NRHP
Orange Station (1918), 73 Lincoln Ave., Orange, N.J., (Nies, F.J.), NRHP
Freight House, Hoboken, N.J. (1918)
Houses for mine foreman and miners, Loomis colliery, Plymouth, Pennsylvania (1919)
Brick Church Station (1921), Brick Church Plaza, East Orange, N.J., (Nies, F.J.), NRHP
East Orange Station (1922), 65 City Hall Plaza, East Orange, N.J., (Nies, F.W.), NRHP

See also
Operating Passenger Railroad Stations Thematic Resource (New Jersey)
Bradford Gilbert
George E. Archer

Gallery

References

20th-century American architects
Delaware, Lackawanna and Western Railroad
American railway architects